A popliteal artery aneurysm is a bulging (aneurysm) of the popliteal artery. A PAA is diagnosed when a focal dilation greater than 50% of the normal vessel diameter is found (the normal diameter of a popliteal artery is 0.7-1.1 cm). PAAs are the most common aneurysm of peripheral vasculature, accounting for 85% of all cases. PAAs are bilateral in some 50% of cases, and are often (40-50%) associated with an abdominal aortic aneurysm.

Popliteal aneurysms are rarely symptomatic; they are typically discovered during routine physical examinations. The cause of these aneurysms is unknown, but they are more common in older people and men and occur in both legs about 50% of the time.

Presentation 
PAAs are most often asymptomatic.Chronic symptoms are most often secondary to the mass effect exerted upon adjoining structures by the aneurysm (e.g. pain and paresthesias due to tibial nerve compression, calf swelling due to compression of the popliteal vein).

Thrombosis within the aneurysm and subsequent luminal narrowing may result in claudication of gradual onset, while an acute thrombosis (occluding the vessel at the side of the aneurysm or lodging distally as the vessel narrows) may lead to acute lower extremity ischaemia and associated symptomatology (pain, paresthesia, paresis, pallor, poikilothermia). Thrombotic occlusion of distal vessels may result in blue toe syndrome, and acrocyanosis. Untreated, some 30% of those affected develop acute thrombosis and distal embolization, risking potential limb loss. In cases with acute thrombosis/embolism, amputation rate is 15%.

Risk factors 
Risk factors predisposing to the development of a PAA include: tobacco smoking, atherosclerosis, connective tissue disorders (e.g. Marfan syndrome, and Ehlers-Danlos syndrome), advanced age (peaking in the 6th to 7th decade of life), male gender, White race, and a family history of aneurysm.

Pathophysiology 
A PAA seldom presents with a size greater than 5cm as symptoms typically develop before the aneurysm reaches such a size. Unlike aneurysms elsewhere in the body, the typical course of PAAs is to embolize and produce ischaemia, rather than to progress to rupture.

Diagnosis 
The popliteal fossa is to be examined bilaterally with the knee in a semi-flexed position. In some 60% of cases, the popliteal aneurysm presents as a palpable pulsatile mass at the level of the knee joint. Doppler ultrasonography is the preferred diagnostic method. CT and MR angiography may also be employed.

Differential diagnosis 
Differential diagnoses include; popliteal cyst, adventitial cyst, lymphadenopathy, varicose vein.

Treatment
It is unclear whether stenting or open surgery is a better for those with aneurysms that are not causing symptoms.

References

Diseases of arteries, arterioles and capillaries